The Ministry or  was one of the Six Ministries under the Department of State Affairs in imperial China.

Functions
Under the Ming, the Ministry of Justice had charge of most judicial and penal processes, but had no authority over the Censorate or the Grand Court of Revision.

See also
 Chinese law
 Capital punishment & Torture in China
 Death by a Thousand Cuts & the Nine Familial Exterminations

References

Citations

Sources 

 

Government of Imperial China
Six Ministries
China
Government of the Ming dynasty
Government of the Tang dynasty
Government of the Song dynasty
Government of the Yuan dynasty
Government of the Qing dynasty
Government of the Sui dynasty